Conasprella insculpta, common name the engraved cone, is a species of sea snail, a marine gastropod mollusk in the family Conidae, the cone snails and their allies.

Like all species within the genus Conasprella, these cone snails are predatory and venomous. They are capable of "stinging" humans, therefore live ones should be handled carefully or not at all.

Description
The size of the shell varies between 18 mm and 66 mm.

Distribution
This marine species occurs off Western Thailand; Fiji, Papua New Guinea, the Philippines, the South China Sea, Taiwan and off the Northern Territory, Australia.

References

 Kiener, L.C. 1845. Spécies général et Iconographie des coquilles vivantes, comprenant la collection du Muséum d'histoire Naturelle de Paris, la collection de Lamarck, celle du Prince Massena (appartenant maintenant a M. le Baron B. Delessert) et les découvertes récentes des voyageurs. Paris : Rousseau et Baillière Vol. 2.
 Reeve, L.A. 1849. Monograph of the genus Conus. pls 4–9 in Reeve, L.A. (ed). Conchologia Iconica. London : L. Reeve & Co. Vol. 1.
 Shuto, T. 1969. Neogene gastropods from Panay Island, the Philippines. Memoires of the Faculty of Science, Kyushu University 19(1): 1–250
 Hinton, A. 1972. Shells of New Guinea and the Central Indo-Pacific. Milton : Jacaranda Press xviii 94 pp.
 Cernohorsky, W.O. 1978. Tropical Pacific marine shells. Sydney : Pacific Publications 352 pp., 68 pls
 Röckel, D., Korn, W. & Kohn, A.J. 1995. Manual of the Living Conidae. Volume 1: Indo-Pacific Region. Wiesbaden : Hemmen 517 pp.
  Puillandre N., Duda T.F., Meyer C., Olivera B.M. & Bouchet P. (2015). One, four or 100 genera? A new classification of the cone snails. Journal of Molluscan Studies. 81: 1–23

External links
 The Conus Biodiversity website
Cone Shells – Knights of the Sea
 
 Syntype in MNHN, Paris

insculpta
Gastropods described in 1847